Beyond the Rainbow is a 2015 Hong Kong slice of life drama television series produced by Hong Kong Television Network. The series was condensed into 15 episodes from 30. The first episode premiered on 12 May 2015.

Cast
 Ha Yu as Tam Kam-shing
 Paw Hee-ching as Choi Yung
 Felix Wong as Tam Koon-hung
 Calvin Lui as young Tam Koon-hung
 Leila Tong as Kwok ching-man / Kelly Yeung Ka-lei
 Emily Kwan as Anita Ting
 Yetta Tse as young Anita Ting
 Savio Tsang as Victor Ting
 Philip Keung as Luk Ho-cheung
 Lam Lei as Wong Yau-fai
 Nick Chong as young Wong Yau-fei
 Cherry Pau as Joey Luk
 Oscar Chan as Kenson Tam
 Lee Fung as Mrs. Kan
 Charles Ying as Ko Ching
 Dexter Young as Wong Shue-ban
 Janice Ting as Ivy
 Luvin Ho as To Kuen
 Anita Kwan as Wan Chi-yau
 Eddie Li as Terry Fok
 Kwok Fung as Yeung Ka-lei's father
 Maggie Wong as Ho Mei-yan
 Chan On-ying as Mrs. Ho
 Alan Luk as news reporter
 Casper Chan as nurse
 Eunice Ho as nurse

Release
A 10-minute preview was released on HKTV's YouTube channel on 5 May 2015.

References

External links
 Official website

Hong Kong Television Network original programming
2015 Hong Kong television series debuts
2010s Hong Kong television series